Lee Soo-sung (born March 10, 1939) is a South Korean politician and legal scholar. He was the 27th Prime Minister of South Korea from December 18, 1995 to March 4, 1997. Prior to becoming prime minister, he was president of Seoul National University.

He later served as the executive vice chairman of the Advisory Council on Democratic and Peaceful Unification, the presidential advisory body on unification with North Korea.

Biography 

He was born in Kankō, Kankyōnan-dō, studied and graduated with a law degree going on to become a judge and following tenure as a lawyer went on become Associate Justice.  During the Korean War he was abducted into North Korea.

Lee Soo-sung enrolled into the Law School of Seoul National University in 1956 following graduation from Seoul High School. He received his Ph.D. degree in 1961 and also received LL.D. from the same university.

His teaching experiences include various positions such as full-time lecturer, assistant professor, associate professor during 1967~1978, exchange researcher at the Pittsburgh University in the USA for 1970~1971 and the Dean of School of Law at the Seoul National University during 1988~1990. 
He was then appointed to the post of the 20th President of the Seoul National University in 1995 while he was teaching as a professor at the same university. He was also appointed as the board chairman of the Samsung Press Foundation and as the Prime Minister of Korea by Kim Young-sam Administration in December of the same year. Accordingly, he resigned his post as the President of the Seoul National University.
   
Following his resignation as the Prime Minister in 1997, he ran for the primary election of the presidential candidate of the New Korea Party but lost the election. In 2000, he founded Democratic National Party along with Kim, Yoon Hwan and Lee, Gi Taek, and ran for the 16th general election without success. During the period of 1998~2000 under Kim Dae-Jung Administration, he was actively involved in international activities including executive vice-chairman of the National Unification Advisory Council of Korea.

Although he initially ran for the 17th Presidential Election in 2007, he voluntarily withdrew his candidacy for the purpose of unification of candidate for the ruling party and maintained neutrality in election. In the Presidential Election in 2012, he supported the presidential candidate of the Democratic United Party, Moon Jae-in.

References

External links
 Lee Soo-sung Naver Profile 

1939 births
Presidents of Seoul National University
Prime Ministers of South Korea
Living people
Seoul High School alumni
Seoul National University School of Law alumni
Academic staff of Seoul National University
South Korean legal scholars